Weist is a surname of German origin. Notable people with the surname include:

Dwight Weist, American actor and announcer
T. J. Weist, American football coach
Werner Weist, German footballer
Ralph Weist Schlosser, American academic

See also
Weist Apartments
Wiest (disambiguation)

Surnames of German origin